Maapallo is the second solo studio album by a Finnish reggae artist Raappana. Released on 1 September 2010, the album peaked at number one on the Finnish Albums Chart.

Track listing

Chart performance

References

2010 albums
Raappana (musician) albums